Diaphus fragilis, the fragile lantern fish, is a species of lanternfish 
found in tropics worldwide.

Size

References

Myctophidae
Taxa named by Åge Vedel Tåning
Fish described in 1932